Kannathangudi East is a village in the Orathanadu taluk of Thanjavur district, Tamil Nadu, India.

Demographics 

As per the 2001 census, Kannathangudi East had a total population of 1622 with 781 males and 841 females. The sex ratio was 1077. The literacy rate was 63.96.

References 

 

Villages in Thanjavur district